Penny Drue Baird, the owner of Dessins, LLC, based in Paris and New York, is an interior designer, also known for her architectural work.

Career 
Penny Drue Baird is a Phi Beta Kappa graduate of the University of Rochester. She has a doctoral degree in psychology and studied interior design at The New York School of Interior Design.

Baird creates atmospheres filled with architectural detail, warmth, and sophisticated charm; she has a penchant for European traditions and style and has been commended for this style in Architectural Digest Designer Profile. She is acknowledged for her in-depth knowledge of sources, especially in Western Europe. Baird divides her time between her offices on Madison Avenue and in Paris. She travels through France and London, looking for unique, fine antique and modern furniture, objets d’art, and cutting-edge design furnishings. Those travels through have been documented in her books, Bringing Paris Home, The New French Interiors and Dreamhouse, published by Monacelli Press.

Her company, Dessins' work is considered eclectic.  Baird's style was recognized in "Unquestionably Addicted to Paris: Penny Drue Baird’s Book List" in September, 2011.

Notable accomplishments 

Baird has been listed as one of Architectural Digest's top 100 of the world's best interior designers and architects. She is also a winner of Rohm & Haas “Prettiest Painted Rooms in America”.

Baird has been mentioned and quoted in over 150 shelter magazines and periodicals, including Architectural Digest's, "A Promise of a Year in Paris",  "The Accent is French", "Charm, Rekindled" Baird is the author of three books and has been featured in an article titled, "Feasts & Celebrations; Fantasy for A Good Cause", in The New York Times.  Baird's work has also been recognized in The Best Interior Designers Magazine, Huffington Post, and DuJour Magazine.

Books
 (with foreword by Mario Buatta). Dreamhouse. New York : The Monacelli Press, 2015 
The New French Interior. New York: Monacelli Press, 2011 
Bringing Paris Home. New York: Monacelli Press, 2008 
Contemporary Classics. Interiors by Penny Drue Baird. New York: Monacelli Press, 2014.

References

External links 
 Official Penny Drue Baird Website 
 Architectural Digest
 New York Social Diary
 Houzz Portfolio Profile
 The Franklin Report

People from New York (state)
Year of birth missing (living people)
American interior designers
University of Rochester alumni
Living people
American women interior designers
21st-century American women